Verticordia endlicheriana var. major is a flowering plant in the myrtle family, Myrtaceae and is endemic to the south-west of Western Australia. It is a small, compact shrub with lightly-scented, lemon-yellow flowers which do not change colour as they age.

Description

Flowering occurs from September to December.

Taxonomy and naming
Verticordia endlicheriana was first formally described by Johannes Conrad Schauer in 1844 and the description was published in Lehmann's Plantae Preissianae. In 1991, Alex George undertook a review of the genus Verticordia and described five varieties of Verticordia endlicheriana including this variety. The varietal name "major" refers to the flowers of this variety which are larger than those in the rest of the species.

Distribution and habitat
This variety grows in sand and gravel, as well as gravelly loam, often with Verticordia subulata, in heath. It occurs between the areas of Pingrup, the Green Range and the Hamersley River in the Esperance Plains and Mallee biogeographic regions.

Conservation
Verticordia endlicheriana var. major is classified as "not threatened" by the Western Australian Government Department of Parks and Wildlife.

Use in horticulture
The compact, robust habit, late flowering and unfading flower colour indicate the horticultural potential of this variety but to date, few attempts to propagate or grow it in gardens have been made.

References

endlicheriana
Rosids of Western Australia
Eudicots of Western Australia
Plants described in 1991